In 2022–23 season, MC Alger are competing in the Ligue 1 for the 54th season and the Algerian Cup. It is their 20th consecutive season in the top flight of Algerian football.

Season summary
On 16 July 2022, Faruk Hadžibegić was appointed as a new head coach. On 20 July 2022, MC Alger agreed with the Rouïba municipality to receive their opponents for the first leg in Salem Mabrouki Stadium, after the closure of the Stade du 5 Juillet for renovation. On September 10, Faruk Hadžibegić was dismissed from his post after only three matches, the contract was canceled by mutual consent.

Squad list
Players and squad numbers last updated on 5 February 2023.Note: Flags indicate national team as has been defined under FIFA eligibility rules. Players may hold more than one non-FIFA nationality.

Competitions

Overview

{| class="wikitable" style="text-align: center"
|-
!rowspan=2|Competition
!colspan=8|Record
!rowspan=2|Started round
!rowspan=2|Final position / round
!rowspan=2|First match	
!rowspan=2|Last match
|-
!
!
!
!
!
!
!
!
|-
| Ligue 1

|  
| To be confirmed
| 27 August 2022
| In Progress
|-
| Algerian Cup

| Round of 64 
| To be confirmed
| 14 February 2023
| In Progress
|-
! Total

Ligue 1

League table

Results summary

Results by round

Matches
The league fixtures were announced on 19 July 2022.

Algerian Cup

Squad information

Playing statistics

|-
! colspan=10 style=background:#dcdcdc; text-align:center| Goalkeepers

|-
! colspan=10 style=background:#dcdcdc; text-align:center| Defenders

|-
! colspan=10 style=background:#dcdcdc; text-align:center| Midfielders

|-
! colspan=10 style=background:#dcdcdc; text-align:center| Forwards

|-
! colspan=10 style=background:#dcdcdc; text-align:center| Players transferred out during the season

Goalscorers

Includes all competitive matches. The list is sorted alphabetically by surname when total goals are equal.

Transfers

In

Summer

Winter

Out

Summer

Winter

New contracts

Notes

References

2022-23
Algerian football clubs 2022–23 season